The 1931 municipal election was held November 11, 1931 to elect a mayor and five aldermen to sit on Edmonton City Council and four trustees to sit on the public school board, while four trustees were acclaimed to the separate school board.

There were ten aldermen on city council, but five of the positions were already filled: James Collisson, Charles Gibbs, Frederick Keillor (SS), Donald Lake, and Charles Gerald O'Connor were all elected to two-year terms in 1930 and were still in office.

There were seven trustees on the public school board, but three of the positions were already filled: Samuel Barnes, Frederick Casselman, and Mrs. W D Ferris had all been elected to two-year terms in 1930 and were still in office.  The same was true of the separate school board, where A J Crowe (SS), J O Pilon, and W D Trainor were continuing.

Voter turnout

There were 22,583 ballots cast out of 42,753 eligible voters, for a voter turnout of 52.8%.

Results

 bold or  indicates elected
 italics indicate incumbent
 "SS", where data is available, indicates representative for Edmonton's South Side, with a minimum South Side representation instituted after the city of Strathcona, south of the North Saskatchewan River, amalgamated into Edmonton on February 1, 1912.

Mayor

Aldermen

Public school trustees

(The figures above were those from the initial count.  Upon completion of a recount, Bowcott was found to have received more votes than Cushing and was therefore elected.)

Separate (Catholic) school trustees

Charles Gariepy, Thomas Magee, T Malone, and J Tansey (SS) were acclaimed.

References

Election History, City of Edmonton: Elections and Census Office

1931
1931 elections in Canada
1931 in Alberta